Kimberly L. Foster (née Passerello, formerly Kimberly L. Turner) is an American mechanical engineer specializing in microelectromechanical systems including stick-slip phenomena, biomimetic adhesives, parametric oscillators, and microsensors. She is dean of science and engineering at Tulane University, where she is also a professor of physics and engineering physics and (by courtesy) of biomedical engineering.

Education and career
Foster is originally from Michigan, and studied engineering at Michigan Technological University, where her father Chris Passerello was a faculty member. She graduated in 1994, taking only three years for her degree. Originally planning to become a veterinarian, she continued in engineering after obtaining a National Science Foundation graduate fellowship. She completed her Ph.D. in 1999 at Cornell University, in theoretical and applied mechanics.

She joined the faculty of the University of California, Santa Barbara in 1999, and served as chair of the department of mechanical engineering there from 2008 to 2013. She moved to Tulane as dean in 2018.

Recognition
Foster was named an ASME Fellow in 2014, "for her major contributions in the area of micro-electro-mechanical-systems" and "extensive service to her professional community".

In 2021, Michigan Technological University named Foster to their Mechanical Engineering-Engineering Mechanics Academy.

References

External links

Year of birth missing (living people)
Living people
American mechanical engineers
American women engineers
Michigan Technological University alumni
Cornell University alumni
University of California, Santa Barbara faculty
Tulane University faculty
Fellows of the American Society of Mechanical Engineers